Daniel Friedman may refer to:
Daniel Fridman (born 1976), Latvian-German chess grandmaster
Daniel Fridman (rabbi), rabbi of the Jewish Center of Teaneck
Dan Friedman (graphic designer) (1945–1995), graphic designer and former Yale faculty member
Daniel Friedman (comedian) (born 1981), South African musical comedian known on stage as Deep Fried Man
Daniel Mortimer Friedman (1916–2011), judge of the United States Court of Appeals for the Federal Circuit
Daniel P. Friedman (born 1944), American computer science professor
Daniel Friedmann (born 1936), Israeli Minister of Justice
Daniel E. Friedmann (born 1956), CEO of MacDonald, Dettwiler and Associates and author of The Genesis One Code
Daniel Friedman (author), American author of mystery fiction

See also
Daniel Freeman (disambiguation)
Daniel Freedman (disambiguation)